Old Town Chinatown is the official Chinatown of the northwest section of Portland, Oregon. The Willamette River forms its eastern boundary, separating it from the Lloyd District and the Kerns and Buckman neighborhoods. It includes the Portland Skidmore/Old Town Historic District and the Portland New Chinatown/Japantown Historic District, which are listed on the National Register of Historic Places. It has been referred to as the "skid row" of Portland.

In the Northwest section, NW Broadway forms the western boundary, separating it from the Pearl District, and W Burnside Street forms the southern boundary, separating it from Downtown Portland. In the Southwest section, the neighborhood extends from SW 3rd Avenue east to the river and from SW Stark Street north to W Burnside Street (with the exception of areas south of SW Pine Street and west of SW 2nd Avenue, and south of SW Oak Street and west of SW 1st Avenue, which are part of Downtown).

Despite the name, most Chinese-Americans and Chinese immigrants had already moved out of the area by the time the city officially reworked it as an official Chinatown in the 1980s; the increase in property values following the renovations drove out many of the remaining Chinese immigrants, with a section of NE 82nd Avenue in East Portland becoming the new unofficial Chinatown. Old Town is well known as the primary homeless district of Portland. The Oregonian reports homelessness, open drug use, crime, and the perception of danger and dirtiness that accompanies them were deterring factors to development. One prominent developer told the newspaper "transient activity" is "perhaps the foremost deterrent" to developing in this neighborhood.

Transportation
The neighborhood is well-served by various modes of transportation. Amtrak's Union Station and the bus station operated by Greyhound Lines are located in the northwestern portion of the neighborhood. The Broadway Bridge marks the northern tip, and the ends of the Steel and Burnside bridges are along the area's eastern border.

The MAX Light Rail line turns south into the neighborhood from the Steel Bridge and stops at Old Town/Chinatown, Skidmore Fountain, and Oak Street/Southwest 1st Avenue; the system connects the neighborhood to Northeast and North Portland across the Willamette, and to Downtown Portland to the south and west. The Portland Mall begins at the Greyhound station, providing local bus and light rail service along 5th and 6th Avenues south into downtown.

Old Town
Old Town was the original urban core of Portland. It straddles West Burnside Street and includes an area under the Burnside Bridge. The Portland Skidmore/Old Town Historic District, created in 1975 and roughly bounded by Naito Parkway, Everett Street, 3rd Avenue, and Oak Street, is an important part of Old Town Portland. Attractions include the Saturday Market; the Shanghai tunnels; and Ankeny Square, site of Portland's oldest public art work, the Skidmore Fountain (dedicated September 22, 1888). The fountain, designed by Olin L. Warner of New York, is named after pioneer druggist Stephen G. Skidmore. Naito Parkway (ex-Front Avenue) is named after the late Bill Naito, a longtime Old Town-based businessman and developer, who with his brother Sam Naito in the 1960s helped to halt the decline of the area—then known as Portland's "Skid Road"—by opening a retail store, buying and restoring old buildings in the area, and convincing others to invest in the district over the next several years. Bill Naito died in 1996.

New Market Block, 50 SW 2nd Ave, is an historic six floor building.

The Portland Skidmore/Old Town Historic District was declared a National Historic Landmark in 1977, its national significance based on its historic importance as a major 19th-century west coast port, and also for its collection of cast-iron commercial architecture. In 2016, Portland Mercury described the Old Town as a neighborhood "well known as Portland's primary homeless district."

Chinatown
The Chinatown portion of Old Town extends north from West Burnside St. to Union Station. The entrance is marked by a China gate (built in 1986), complete with a pair of lions, at the corner of NW 4th Ave. and W Burnside St. The core of the area, from W Burnside St. to NW Glisan St. and from NW 5th Ave. to NW 3rd Ave., was designated in 1989 the Portland New Chinatown/Japantown Historic District.

Major organizations based in Chinatown include the Port of Portland, Oregon Department of Transportation's Portland offices and NW Natural Gas. There is also a parking structure with a helipad on top.

In a step towards revitalization of the area, the Lan Su Chinese Garden opened September 14, 2000. The $12.8 million park covers an entire city block and was built by 65 artisans from Suzhou, China of imported materials (though all plants were grown locally). More recently, NW 3rd and 4th Avenues received streetscape improvements, including plaques describing historical features. Two block-long "festival streets" that can easily be used for street festivals were also created between these streets. In 2008, Uwajimaya anchored a redevelopment proposal, similar to the Uwajimaya Village in Seattle's Chinatown-International District. It would host the store, an underground parking garage, mixed-income apartments, and other small retailers. It was hoped to revitalize the area and bring in more tourists.
In August 2011, Uwajimaya decided not to put a store in Chinatown because its stores in downtown Seattle and Renton, Washington are not meeting their potentials.

Japantown history

Prior to World War II, the area that is today called Chinatown was Portland's Japantown. Beginning in the 1890s, many Japanese immigrants were processed through Portland, creating a demand for hotels, bathhouses, and other services. Businesses that formed in the city's Japantown thrived in the low-rent areas near the river. Before World War II, the Japantown in the Northwest District was home to more than 100 businesses, and was Oregon's largest Japantown. Today the Japanese American Historical Plaza and the Oregon Nikkei Legacy Center in what is today Portland's Chinatown serve as reminders of what was once Portland's Japantown.

Translation of street names 
The street signs in Chinatown are both English and Chinese. The Chinese on the signs is written in traditional characters, and its pronunciation is Cantonese (using Jyutping romanization).
 W Burnside Street —  — 
 NW Couch Street —  — 
 NW Davis Street —  — 
 NW Everett Street —  — 
 NW Fifth Avenue —  — 
 NW Flanders Street —  — 
 NW Fourth Avenue —  — 
 NW Glisan Street —  — 
 NW Third Avenue —  —

See also
 Pensole

References

External links

 Old Town/Chinatown information from Old Town Chinatown Neighborhood Association
 Self-Guided Walking Tour of Portland's Chinatown from Travel Portland
 National Historic Landmark Nomination for Skidmore/Old Town Historic District
 Portland's Chinatown History and Resources from Friends of Portland Chinatown
Old Town-Chinatown Street Tree Inventory Report

1975 establishments in Oregon
Portland, Oregon
Neighborhoods in Portland, Oregon
Northwest Portland, Oregon
 
Southwest Portland, Oregon
Tourist attractions in Portland, Oregon
Chinese-American culture in Portland, Oregon